Kuiyang may refer to:

 Kuiyang, Nanjing County (奎洋镇), town in Fujian, China
 Kuiyang, Xingye County (葵阳镇), town in Guangxi, China